John Woodvine (born 21 July 1929) is an English actor who has appeared in more than 70 theatre productions, as well as a similar number of television and film roles.

Early life
Woodvine was born in Tyne Dock, South Shields, Tyne & Wear, England, the son of Rose (née Kelly) and John Woodvine. He was educated at Lord Williams's School, Thame, Oxfordshire and trained for the stage at the Royal Academy of Dramatic Art, graduating in 1953.

Career
Woodvine worked with the Old Vic company in the 1950s. In 1957, along with Russell Napier, John Carlisle and Edgar Lustgarten, Woodvine appeared in an installment of the Scotland Yard film series ("The Silent Weapon", 1961). Woodvine also had a long career with the Royal Shakespeare Company, having appeared in 1976 opposite Ian McKellen and Judi Dench as Banquo in the acclaimed Trevor Nunn production of Macbeth, which was later recorded for television. He also appeared in the RSC's 1980 landmark production of The Life and Adventures of Nicholas Nickleby, starring as the story's primary antagonist, Ralph Nickleby.

Woodvine frequently played police officers from early in his career, including a regular role in the British drama series Z-Cars as Det. Insp. Witty (1968–69) and guest appearances in Softly, Softly in the 1970s. He re-created his role of Inspector Kingdom in the 1970s police drama New Scotland Yard. He is also particularly remembered as the disgruntled former policeman who took the lead character hostage in a 1983 episode of Juliet Bravo. His role as a policeman even extended to playing the traditional village 'bobby', as Constable Tedder in the BBC television adaptation of Arthur Ransome's Big Six and Coot Club. Further, it extended to the comedic police role of Sir Malachi Jellicoe in The New Statesman.
In 1969, he appeared as the Manchester cleansing depot inspector, Mr. Sinclair, referred to as "Bloody Delilah" by his subordinates, in first season of The Dustbinmen.

In 1971 Woodvine played the corrupt and vengeful Trincant in Ken Russell's filmThe Devils. Woodvine also played Macduff in the Play of the Month television broadcast of Macbeth on 20 September 1970, Union convenor Les Mallow in series 1 of When the Boat Comes In in 1975, the Marshal in the 1979 Doctor Who serial The Armageddon Factor and Chief Superintendent Ross in Edge of Darkness and appeared in several episodes of the 1985 television adaptation of The Tripods. He also played a memorable role as Prior Mordrin in the 1987 ITV series Knights of God. More recently he played Frank Gallagher's father, Neville, in the Channel 4 offbeat drama Shameless, and PC Tony Stamp's father Norman in The Bill. In 2008, he appeared in the BBC2 comedy Never Better and as Joe Jacobs in the ITV1 soap Emmerdale. In 2010, he appeared as Alan Hoyle in Coronation Street. In December 1987 he played Dr. James Shepherd in "The Murder of Roger Ackroyd", one of a series of Agatha Christie novels broadcast on radio by the BBC. In 2016, he played the role of the Archbishop of York in 4 episodes of the Netflix series The Crown.

His film roles include the 1981 John Landis film An American Werewolf in London (he later re-created his film role for the BBC Radio One adaptation of the film). He also appeared in the Oscar-nominated 1972 Richard Attenborough film Young Winston. Woodvine also starred as "Arthur Birling" in the BBC World Service radio adaptation of An Inspector Calls and as "Dr. Byron Caligari" in the BBC Radio 4 macabre comedy series The Cabaret of Dr Caligari. Most recently, he voiced the role of "Prospero" on 6 May 2012 broadcast of The Tempest on BBC Radio 3.

Theatre
Woodvine made apprentice appearances with James Cooper's Renegades Theatre Company in Ilford, where he played such parts as the Conjur Man in  Dark of the Moon and Claudius in Hamlet (a role he repeated with Prospect Theatre Company). In 1954 he played Caspar Darde in Captain Carvallo on a tour of service establishments.

He joined the Old Vic company in September 1954, 'walking on' in Macbeth. Later in the same season he played Vincentio in The Taming of the Shrew (November 1954); Duke (Senior) in As You Like It (March 1955); Vernon in Part 1 and Lord Chief Justice in Part 2 of Henry IV (April 1955); Flavius in Julius Caesar (September 1955); Rugby in The Merry Wives of Windsor (September 1955); Cleomenes in The Winter's Tale (November 1955); and the Bishop of Ely and Macmorris in Henry V (December 1955).

In 1956 his roles for the company included Roderigo in Othello (February); Calchas in Troilus and Cressida (April); Murderer in Macbeth (May); Tybalt in Romeo and Juliet (June); and Lord Scroop of Berkeley in Richard II (July). These four last-named productions toured, including a three-week season at the Winter Garden Theatre in New York in December 1956 and January 1957. Returning to the company in September 1959, he played Careless in The Double Dealer (William Congreve); Mowbray in Richard II; and Nym in The Merry Wives of Windsor.

Personal life
Woodvine is married to actress Lynn Farleigh. His daughter is the actress Mary Woodvine. On 11 May 2012 Woodvine collapsed offstage during a Grand Theatre, Leeds, performance of the musical Carousel, shortly after his appearance as the Starkeeper. Although the reason for the collapse was unknown, he was admitted to hospital and made a full recovery.

Roles

His roles have included:
Harry Y. Esterbrook in Inherit the Wind, St Martin's Theatre, March 1960
General Lew Wallace in The Andersonville Trial, Mermaid, June 1961
Vasquez in 'Tis Pity She's a Whore, Mermaid, August 1961
Long John Silver in Treasure Island, Mermaid, December 1961
Pentheus in The Bacchae, Mermaid, February 1964
Title role in Macbeth, Mermaid, April 1964
Simon Eyre in The Shoemaker's Holiday, Mermaid, July 1964
Theseus in Oedipus at Colonus, Mermaid, May 1965
Cutler Walpole in The Doctor's Dilemma, Comedy Theatre, June 1966
Badger in Toad of Toad Hall, Comedy Theatre, December 1966
Jackie in Close the Coalhouse Door (Alan Plater), Fortune Theatre, October 1968
Warrant Office Ormsby in Poor Horace, Lyric Theatre, May 1970
Joe Wilson in a solo performance Joe Lives!, Newcastle University and Greenwich Theatre, June 1971
Claudius in Hamlet, Prospect Company tour, August 1971
Joined the Actors' Company in 1973 playing Sir Wiful Witwoud in The Way of the World, (Edinburgh Festival); Orlovsky in The Wood Demon; Kent in King Lear: including performances in all three parts at the Brooklyn Academy, New York, January 1974 and Wimbledon Theatre, March–May 1974.
Cardinal in 'Tis Pity She's a Whore, March 1974, and Pontagnac in Ruling the Roost (Feydeau farce), Wimbledon, April 1974
Staller in Stallerhof (Franz Xaver Kroetz), Hampstead Theatre, February 1975
Gerald in The Formation Dancers (Frank Marcus), Yvonne Arnaud Theatre, Guildford, May 1975
Joined the RSC for the 1976 Stratford season, playing Duke of Cornwall in King Lear; Dogberry in Much Ado About Nothing; Polixenes in The Winter's Tale; and Banquo in Macbeth (the latter also at The Other Place, August 1976, and Donmar Warehouse, September 1977).
Doctor Pinch in The Comedy of Errors, RSC Aldwych, June 1977
Repeated the roles of Dogberry and Capulet at the RSC Aldwych, June–July 1977
Subtle in The Alchemist. RSC The Other Place, May 1977; and RSC Aldwych, December 1977
Fainall in The Way of the World, RSC Aldwych, January 1978
Alexander in Every Good Boy Deserves Favour, RSC Mermaid, June 1978
For the 1979 RSC Stratford season he played Sir John Falstaff in The Merry Wives of Windsor, Malvolio in Twelfth Night, and the title role in Julius Caesar; also playing Falstaff and Malvolio at the RSC Aldwych, 1980 season
Ralph Nickleby in The Life and Adventures of Nicholas Nickleby (David Edgar), RSC Aldwych Theatre, June 1980 – June 1981; (re-staged at the Old Vic for television recording, July–August 1981)
Charles Merrythought in The Knight of the Burning Pestle (Beaumont and Fletcher), in repertory RSC Aldwych, April–June 1981
Ralph Nickleby in Nicholas Nickleby, Plymouth Theatre, NY, October 1981 – January 1982
Mr Prince in Rocket to the Moon (Clifford Odets), Hampstead Theatre, August 1982 and Apollo Theatre, September–November 1982
Sir John Falstaff in '’The Henrys'’ (Henry IV parts 1 and 2, and Henry V), English Shakespeare Company, Old Vic, March–May 1987
Gregor Hasek in Between East and West (Richard Nelson). Hampstead, December 1987 – January 1988
Gens in Ghetto (Joshua Sobol), National Theatre, Olivier, April–November 1989
Chris Christopherson in Anna Christie (Eugene O'Neill), Young Vic, June–July 1990
Shylock in The Merchant of Venice, and the title role in Volpone, English Shakespeare Company, Lyric Hammersmith and Warwick Arts Centre, February–March 1991
Duncan in Macbeth, and Prospero in The Tempest, English Shakespeare Company, Lyric Hammersmith, November–December 1992
George H Jones in Machinal (Sophie Treadwell), National Theatre, Lyttelton, October 1993 – February 1994
Monsewer in The Hostage (Brendan Behan), RSC Barbican, September–October 1994
Frank Armstrong in Heartbeat October 1995
Priuli in Venice Preserv'd (Thomas Otway), Almeida Theatre, October–December 1995
Jacques in As You Like It, RSC Barbican, October 1996 – March 1997
Sir Henry Clinton in The General from America (Richard Nelson), RSC The Pit, February–April 1997
Aslaksen in An Enemy of the People (Ibsen), National Theatre Olivier, September 1997 – January 1998
Jack Donovan in Give Me Your Answer, Do! (Brian Friel), Hampstead, March–May 1998
Flavius in Timon of Athens, RSC Royal Shakespeare Theatre, Stratford, August 1999; and RSC Barbican, March–April 2000
King Philip II of Spain in Don Carlos (Schiller), RSC The Pit, January–April 2000
Edgar Johnson in Life After Life (Paul Jepson/Tony Parker), National Theatre Lyttelton Loft, May–June 2002
The Player King in Hamlet, RSC Courtyard Theatre, Stratford, July 2008

Partial filmography
Darling (1965) – Customs Officer (uncredited)
Coronation Street (1965) Lorry Driver
Dangerman Episode: Judgement Day (1965) – Shimon
The Walking Stick (1970) – Bertie Irons
The Devils (1971) – Trincant
Young Winston (1972) – Howard
Assault on Agathon (1977) – Matt Fenrek
The Quiz Kid (1979) – Dennis
An American Werewolf in London (1981) – Dr J. S. Hirsch
Spaghetti House (1982) – Alto Funzionario
Squaring the Circle (1984) – Gierek
Knights of God (1987) – Prior Mordrin
The New Statesman (1987) – Sir Malachi Jellicoe
Danny, the Champion of the World (1989) – Tallon
Countdown to War (1989) – Joachim von Ribbentrop
Leon the Pig Farmer (1992) – Vitelli
Emily Brontë's Wuthering Heights (1992) – Thomas Earnshaw
The Trial (1993) – Herr Deimen
Dragonworld (1994) – Lester MacIntyre
Fatherland (1994) – Luther
Persuasion (1995) – Admiral Croft
Vanity Fair (2004) – Lord Bareacres
Miss Potter (2006) – Sir Nigel
The Midnight Drives (2007) – Guesthouse Owner
Flick (2008) – Dr Nickel
Burke & Hare (2010) – Lord Provost
Joe Maddison's War (2010 TV film) – Father Connolly
Vera (2014) “Protected” S4:E2 – Alan Kenworthy
The Crown (2016 TV series) – the Archbishop of York
Enys Men (2022) – The Preacher

Narration
Greatest goals : the World Cup from Charlton to Maradona (1987)

References

The Nicholas Nickleby Story: The making of the RSC production by Leon Rubin, Heinemann, London (1981) 
Theatre Record and its annual Indexes

External links

1929 births
Living people
Alumni of RADA
Actors from County Durham
Male actors from Tyne and Wear
English male film actors
English male Shakespearean actors
English male stage actors
English male television actors
Laurence Olivier Award winners
People from South Shields
Royal Shakespeare Company members